Cardiff North is a constituency of the Senedd. It elects one Member of the Senedd by the first past the post method of election. Also, however, it is one of eight constituencies in the South Wales Central electoral region, which elects four additional members, in addition to eight constituency members, to produce a degree of proportional representation for the region as a whole.

Boundaries 

The constituency was created for the first election to the Assembly, in 1999, with the name and boundaries of the Cardiff North Westminster constituency. It is entirely within the preserved county of South Glamorgan. To the north within the boundaries lies North Rural Cardiff and to the south lies the densely populated area of Whitchurch, Rhiwbina, Thornhill etc.

The other seven constituencies of the region are Cardiff Central, Cardiff South and Penarth, Cardiff West, Cynon Valley, Pontypridd, Rhondda and Vale of Glamorgan.

Voting
In general elections for the National Assembly for Wales, each voter has two votes. The first vote may be used to vote for a candidate to become the Assembly Member for the voter's constituency, elected by the first past the post system. The second vote may be used to vote for a regional closed party list of candidates. Additional member seats are allocated from the lists by the d'Hondt method, with constituency results being taken into account in the allocation. In both the 2011 and 2016 elections, Julie Morgan won the highest number of votes of any candidate in any constituency in Wales.

Assembly members

Election results

Elections in the 2020s

Elections in the 2010s 

Regional ballots rejected at the count: 214

Elections in the 2000s 

2003 Electorate: 64,528
Regional ballots rejected: 328

Elections in the 1990s 

1999 Electorate: 61,253

References 

Senedd constituencies in the South Wales Central electoral region
Politics of Cardiff
1999 establishments in Wales
Constituencies established in 1999